This is a list of churches in the Scottish Episcopal Church organised by dedication. For lists organised by diocese, see the pages for the individual dioceses.

Churches in Scotland